Hussein Javu (born 10 August 1991) is a Tanzanian football striker who plays for Ndanda. He was a squad member at the 2011 CECAFA Cup.

References

1991 births
Living people
Tanzanian footballers
Tanzania international footballers
Mtibwa Sugar F.C. players
Young Africans S.C. players
Alliance Academy F.C. players
Ndanda F.C. players
Association football forwards
Tanzanian Premier League players